A water dog is a type of gundog bred to flush and retrieve game from water.

Water dog, waterdog or water-dog may also refer to:

Animals

Dogs
Cantabrian Water Dog
Lagotto Romagnolo (a.k.a. Italian Water Dog)
Moscow Water Dog, extinct breed
Portuguese Water Dog
Spanish Water Dog
St. John's water dog, extinct

Other animals
 Waterdog, the gilled, aquatic larval form of the tiger salamander, often sold as pets or fishing bait
 Waterdog, a common name for the genus Necturus, which can also be called mudpuppy
 Water-dog, a former colloquial term for the giant otter

Other
The Water Dog, a 1914 American film starring Fatty Arbuckle
Water Dog Lake, Belmont, California